Alexandra Fusai (born 22 November 1973) is a former professional tennis player from France.

Fusai was born in Saint-Cloud, Hauts-de-Seine. Starting from September 1989 when she turned professional, Fusai played four tournaments (all of them part of the ITF Women's Circuit) on the international tennis circuit in 1989. She played right-handed and lived in Nantes during her career. She retired from the professional tennis circuit in April 2003 when she discovered that she was pregnant with her first child. Fusai's highest WTA rankings were No. 37 and No. 6 respectively, both attained in 1998. Her career prize money earnings reached the one million USD-mark in 1999.

Fusai won six singles titles on the ITF Women's Circuit. She reached her only career WTA Tour singles final in Warsaw in 1995, losing to Barbara Paulus of Austria in three sets. She was a losing singles quarterfinalist on six occasions and a losing singles semifinalist on three occasions in WTA tournaments. Fusai never advanced beyond the singles third round of the main draw of any Grand Slam tournament. She earned her career-best singles victory at the Italian Open in Rome in 1998 by beating world No. 3 Jana Novotná.

Fusai excelled as a doubles player. She achieved her best results in doubles competition in partnership with fellow Frenchwoman Nathalie Tauziat from 1997 to 2000. She was a losing quarterfinalist on four occasions and a losing semifinalist on three occasions in seven Grand Slam women's doubles tournaments; in five of those tournaments, her doubles partner was Tauziat. Fusai's doubles performances qualified her to play in the year-ending WTA Tour Championships in 1997, 1998, 1999, 2000. and 2001; her doubles partner was Tauziat in the 1997, 1998, 1999 and 2000 editions of the WTA Tour Championships. She and Tauziat were the runners-up there in 1997 and 1998. All in all, Fusai won a total of 12 WTA Tour doubles titles, eight of them with Tauziat. She was the doubles runner-up in WTA Tour tournaments on 21 occasions, eleven of them with Tauziat. Fusai was a losing doubles semifinalist in WTA tournaments on 27 occasions, excluding Grand Slam tournaments:  1992(1), 1993(1), 1994(1), 1995(2), 1996(1), 1997(3), 1998(4), 1999(4), 2000(3), 2001(6), 2003(1). Fusai had a career women's doubles win–loss record of 300–225 (260–192 for only main draw matches in WTA Tour tournaments).

Fusai achieved her best mixed-doubles result at the 2001 French Open; she was paired with Jérôme Golmard and they lost in the quarterfinals. Fusai was a member of the France Fed Cup team that won the title in 1997, winning all the three World Group doubles matches that she played from the opening round (quarterfinals) against Japan to the final against the Netherlands. She also played for her country in the Fed Cup in 1994 and 1998. She had a Fed Cup career record of 1–1 in singles and 5–1 in doubles. However, Fusai did not play for her country in the Olympic Games.

Fusai married David Crochu on 13 July 2002. Their son Oscar was born on 7 December 2003.

WTA career finals

Singles (0–1)

Doubles (12–21)

ITF finals

Singles (6–2)

Doubles (2–7)

References

External links
 
 
 

1973 births
Living people
French female tennis players
Sportspeople from Nantes
Sportspeople from Saint-Cloud
20th-century French women